Maurice Antonia Jones (born September 14, 1964) is the CEO of OneTen, a coalition of companies dedicated to creating one million jobs for African Americans by the end of the 2020s. Previously, he was president and CEO of the Local Initiatives Support Corporation, a national community development financial institution. Previously, he served as the Deputy Secretary of HUD in the Obama administration,  and then as the Virginia Secretary of Commerce in the cabinet of Governor Terry McAuliffe.

Jones was born in rural Mecklenburg County and grew up on his grandparents' tobacco farm near the town of Kenbridge. He earned a bachelor's degree in political science from Hampden–Sydney College, where he graduated Omicron Delta Kappa, before attending St. John's College, Oxford on a Rhodes scholarship and the University of Virginia School of Law.

In November 2020, Jones was named a candidate for United States Secretary of Housing and Urban Development in the Biden Administration.

References

1964 births
African-American people in Virginia politics
African-American state cabinet secretaries
American Rhodes Scholars
Hampden–Sydney College alumni
Living people
People from Kenbridge, Virginia
People from Mecklenburg County, Virginia
State cabinet secretaries of Virginia
United States Deputy Secretaries of Housing and Urban Development
University of Virginia School of Law alumni
Obama administration personnel